Agathymus remingtoni, the coahuila giant skipper, is a species of giant skipper in the butterfly family Hesperiidae. It is found in Central America.

References

Further reading

 

Megathyminae
Articles created by Qbugbot
Butterflies described in 1958